"Nos vies parallèles" is a song recorded by French-Indonesian singer Anggun and French singer Florent Pagny. The song was written by Thierry Surgeon and Frédéric Chateau for Anggun's sixth French-language album Toujours un ailleurs (2015). It was released as the album's second single by TF1 Musique on 15 September 2015. The music video for the song was directed by Igreco from HiFive Production and took location in Cuba.

Track listing and formats
Digital download
"Nos vies parallèles" – 3:29

Charts

References

External links
 Official music video for "Nos vies parallèles". YouTube

2015 singles
2015 songs
Anggun songs
Florent Pagny songs